is a Japanese sailor, who specialized in two-person dinghy (470) class. He represented Japan, along with his partner Tetsuya Matsunaga, at the 2008 Summer Olympics, and has also been training for Three Bond Sailing Team in Kyoto throughout his sporting career under his longtime coach and mentor Kenji Nakamura.

Ueno qualified as crew member for the Japanese squad in the men's 470 class at the 2008 Summer Olympics in Beijing, by placing fifteenth and receiving a berth from the World Championships in Melbourne, Australia. Teaming up with skipper Matsunaga in the eleven-race series, the Japanese duo mounted a marvelous lead in the opening leg, but came up short for the medal with a net score of 97 and a seventh-place finish in a fleet of twenty-nine boats.

References

External links
 
 
 
 
 Japanese Olympic Team Profile 

1980 births
Living people
Japanese male sailors (sport)
Olympic sailors of Japan
Sailors at the 2008 Summer Olympics – 470
Sportspeople from Fukuoka Prefecture